Phonology is a branch of linguistics. It may also refer to:
 Phonology (journal), a journal published by Cambridge University Press
 Phonology: An Introduction to Basic Concepts, book by Roger Lass
Phonology (Carr book), book by Philip Carr
Phonology: Theory and Analysis, 1975 book by Larry Hyman
 Phonology: Analysis and Theory, 2002 book by Edmund Gussmann
Phonology: A Formal Introduction, 2018 book by Charles Reiss